St. Joseph's Public School is a school in the King Koti area of Hyderabad, India. The principal is U. G. Reddy, and the headmistress is Aparna.

The school started with a population of 30 students and 5 teachers and today has a population of 7000 students and 250 teachers.
The school is divided into three blocks. Classes P-I to VI are in the main block which is a three storied building. Two classes are there in each floor. The middle school block has classes VII & VIII in a separate building and the new ISC block is for classes IX to XII.

Branches 
Apart from the main branch at Koti, the school has a branch at Asman Garh Palace and Ramanthapur

See also
Education in India
List of schools in India
List of institutions of higher education in Telangana

References

External links 

Schools in Hyderabad, India
Schools in Telangana
Educational institutions in India with year of establishment missing